The Lynn-Way dwarf gecko (Hemiphyllodactylus linnwayensis) is a species of gecko. It is endemic to Myanmar.

References

Hemiphyllodactylus
Reptiles described in 2017
Endemic fauna of Myanmar
Reptiles of Myanmar